Antero Vartia (born 22 August 1980 in Helsinki) is a Finnish politician, entrepreneur and former actor representing the Green League. He was elected to the Parliament of Finland in the parliamentary election in 2015. Previously he was a candidate in the 2014 European Parliament election.

Vartia is known from the Finnish soap opera Salatut elämät, in which he played Kuisma Savolainen. Later he co-hosted the Finnish version of the Dutch documentary series Spoorloos. Vartia's mother is from Iceland, and thus Vartia has dual citizenship of Finland and Iceland.

References

1980 births
Living people
Politicians from Helsinki
Finnish people of Icelandic descent
Green League politicians
Members of the Parliament of Finland (2015–19)
Finnish male television actors
Male actors from Helsinki
21st-century Finnish male actors